Malé Březno is a municipality and village in Ústí nad Labem District in the Ústí nad Labem Region of the Czech Republic. It has about 500 inhabitants.

Administrative parts
The village of Leština is an administrative part of Malé Březno.

References

Villages in Ústí nad Labem District